Haydon may refer to:

Place names
Haydon, Dorset, a village and civil parish in Dorset, England
Haydon, Northumberland, a civil parish in Northumberland, England
Haydon Bridge, a village in Northumberland, England
Haydon, Somerset, a village in England

People with the given name
Haydon L. Boatner (1900–1977), American army general
Haydon Hare (1869–1944), English composer
Haydon Kilmartin (born 1973), Australian rules footballer
Haydon Manning, Australian political scientist
Haydon Roberts (born 2002), English footballer
Haydon Smith (1901–1948), English cricketer
Haydon Spenceley (born 1984), English Christian musician
Haydon Warren-Gash (born 1949), British diplomat

People with the surname
 Benjamin Haydon (1786–1846), English painter and writer
 John A. Haydon (1830–1902), American civil engineer and civil war veteran
 Elizabeth Haydon, fantasy author
 Jimmy Haydon (1901–1969), English footballer
 Jodie Haydon (born 1979), Australian financial planner, women's advocate, and the partner of Prime Minister of Australia Anthony Albanese
 Glen Haydon (born 1965), American musicologist
 Mark Haydon, Australian thief and assistant murderer; one of the people in the Snowtown murders case

Other uses
Haydon, the mascot of the English football club AFC Wimbledon

See also 

Haden (disambiguation)
Hayden (disambiguation)
Heyden (disambiguation)
Heydon (disambiguation)